Schlosser is a German surname which can mean "locksmith", "machinist", or "metal worker." Notable people with the surname include:

Eric Schlosser (born 1959), American journalist and writer
Friedrich Christoph Schlosser (1776–1861), German historian
Herbert Schlosser (1926-2021), American television executive
Imre Schlosser (1889–1959), Hungarian footballer
John F. Schlosser (1839-?), New York State Senator
Julius von Schlosser (1866–1938), Austrian art historian
Max Schlosser (zoologist) (1854-1932), German zoologist and paleontologist
Merle Schlosser (1926–1993), American football player and coach

See also
Fort Schlosser, fortification built in New York state around 1760
58896 Schlosser, asteroid
Schlösser

German-language surnames
Occupational surnames